Dakota Max North (born 4 August 1991) is a former motorcycle speedway rider from Australia.

Career
North, named by his father – former Stoke Potters rider Rod North – after the Douglas Dakota aircraft, was born in Shepparton, Victoria, Australia in 1991. He took up speedway at the age of twelve and won the Australian Under-16 Championship and the Australian Junior Pairs title (with Justin Sedgmen) in 2007.

After a few appearances in Britain in 2007, he signed with Mildenhall Fen Tigers in 2009, but his season was cut short after chipping two vertebrae in a crash while representing Australia at Under-21 level in July against Great Britain. In December 2009 he was signed by Elite League Peterborough Panthers as a club asset and was loaned to Premier League team Newcastle Diamonds for the 2010 season. 

He signed for Somerset Rebels for the 2011 season, also doubling-up in the Elite League with the Panthers.  In 2012, North joined the Ipswich Witches in a loan deal. In April 2012 he was added to the King's Lynn Stars team in the Elite League, replacing Filip Šitera, but was replaced at the end of the month by Mateusz Szczepaniak. The following month, he signed for Birmingham Brummies, sharing a doubling-up position with Josh Auty. In 2013, he signed to ride in the Elite League for Peterborough Panthers. In July 2013 North joined the Glasgow Tigers until the end of the 2013 season, whilst also continuing his duties with the Panthers

World Final appearances

Individual Under-21 World Championship
 2012 – 15th – 21pts

Under-21 World Cup
 2012 –  Gniezno, Stadion Start Gniezno S.A. – 2nd – 44pts (8)

References

1991 births
Living people
Australian speedway riders
Mildenhall Fen Tigers riders
Newcastle Diamonds riders
Somerset Rebels riders
Peterborough Panthers riders
Ipswich Witches riders
King's Lynn Stars riders
Birmingham Brummies riders